Clifton Craig Collins Jr. is an American actor. After starting in 1990, with small roles in film and on television, Collins gained attention for his performance as Cpl. Ramon Aguilar, a prisoner "serving" under an imprisoned general played by Robert Redford in the 2001 film The Last Castle. His extensive work includes featured roles in films such as One Eight Seven (1997), Traffic (2000), Capote (2005), Star Trek (2009) and Pacific Rim (2013). Collins' extensive work on television series includes Crisis Center (1997), Thief (2006), which earned him a Primetime Emmy Award nomination, The Event (2010–2011), and Westworld (2016–2020), as well as the video game Grand Theft Auto: San Andreas (2004).

Early life
Collins was born in Los Angeles, California. He is the grandson of actor Pedro Gonzalez Gonzalez. He is sometimes credited as Clifton Gonzalez-Gonzalez in honor of his grandfather. His father is of German descent and his mother is of Mexican ancestry.

Career
He first broke through the mainstream in 1997 with a performance as gangster César Sánchez in the film One Eight Seven. In 1998, he was in Ray Bradbury's cult film The Wonderful Ice Cream Suit. He next portrayed a gay hitman named Francisco "Frankie Flowers" Flores for the Mexican drug cartels in Steven Soderbergh's 2000 ensemble drama Traffic.

For his portrayal of a USMC prisoner in the 2001 film The Last Castle Collins was nominated for the 2002 American Latino Media Arts (ALMA) Award for Best Supporting Actor in a motion picture.  In 2002, he played the role of Buddy in the film American Girl.

In 2005, Collins won rave reviews for his subtle portrayal of killer Perry Smith in the film Capote, which was nominated for the Academy Award for Best Picture in 2006.

He starred in the 2005 film Dirty. Collins starred on FX Networks' series Thief and received an Emmy nomination. Collins also played a supporting role on FX Networks' series The Shield as undercover ICE agent Hernan. He also has a small role in 2006's Babel, directed by Alejandro González Iñárritu.

In 2007, Collins took the lead role in the indie feature The Perfect Game, playing former baseball player Cesar Faz, who coaches a local Mexican youth league team, leading them all the way to the Little League World Series.

In 2008, Collins directed two music videos for the country music group Zac Brown Band: "Chicken Fried" and "Whatever It Is". Chicken Fried won the 2009 CMT breakthrough music video of the year award.

Collins starred in the comedy Sunshine Cleaning with Amy Adams, Emily Blunt and Alan Arkin. He played Winston, the owner of a cleaning supply shop who builds meticulously detailed model airplanes with only one arm. Collins played the role with one arm bound tightly behind his back. In 2009's Star Trek, Collins plays Ayel, a Romulan, second in command to the villain Nero.

In 2009, Collins joined Adrien Brody and Forest Whitaker in the psychological thriller The Experiment. Collins starred in Extract, a 2009 film by director Mike Judge. He co-produced the film National Lampoon's TV: The Movie in which he played Officer Sanchez alongside Jacob Vargas. He also voiced the fictional video game character Cesar Vialpando in Grand Theft Auto: San Andreas. In 2009, he played Romeo in the film The Boondock Saints II: All Saints Day.

In 2010, Collins joined the cast of NBC's drama The Event as Thomas. The following year, he guests on two episodes of CSI: NY as a man named Raymond Harris, an ex-convict who seeks revenge against Mac Taylor and his partner to get some answers regarding a 17-year grudge against them. The episodes also guest-starred the now late Peter Fonda, who Collins previously worked with in San Andreas, as Taylor's ex-partner, who ends up getting killed by Harris. In 2014, Collins portrayed a law enforcement official, Franco Rodriguez, alongside Casey Affleck, Anthony Mackie, Norman Reedus, Woody Harrelson, Kate Winslet in Triple 9.

In 2015, HBO's science fiction drama Westworld added Collins as Lawrence / El Lazo, a charming but lethal outlaw, with a knack for maneuvering and negotiating the various criminal elements.

In 2019, Collins Jr. filmed Jockey, which won the Sundance Film Festival U.S. Dramatic Special Jury Award for best acting.

Awards 
In 2019, Collins was awarded an Impact Award by the National Hispanic Media Coalition for his "Outstanding Performance in Film and Television". On October 29, 2021, he will receive the Distinguished Performance Award at the SCAD Savannah Film Festival.

Writing
He wrote his first book, Prison Ramen: Recipes and Stories from Behind Bars with Gustavo "Goose" Alvarez, in 2015.

Filmography

Film

Television

Video games

Awards and nominations

References

External links 
 
 
 
 
 

20th-century American male actors
21st-century American male actors
American film producers
American male film actors
American male television actors
American male voice actors
American male video game actors
American male actors of Mexican descent
American people of German descent
Film producers from California
Hispanic and Latino American male actors
Living people
Male actors from Los Angeles
Outstanding Performance by a Cast in a Motion Picture Screen Actors Guild Award winners
Sundance Film Festival award winners
1970 births